Santa Marta do Bouro is a parish in Amares Municipality in the Braga District in Portugal. The population in 2011 was 490, in an area of 9.50 km².

References

Freguesias of Amares